Scott McAboy (born February 21, 1975 in Malibu, California) is an American director and producer best known for the children's movies Splitting Adam, Jinxed, Big Time Movie, Escape from Mr. Lemoncello's Library, Swindle, Saved, Son of the Beach and The Fairly OddParents.

McAboy won the Leo Award for Best Direction in a Youth or Children's Program or Series and Best Youth or Children's Program or Series for Splitting Adam in June 2016. Santa Hunters and  also won a Leo Award in 2015 for Best Youth or Children's Program or Series. Most recently, McAboy won a Leo Award (2018) for Best Direction in a Youth or Children's Program or Series and Best Youth or Children's Program or Series for Escape from Mr. Lemoncello's Library (2017).

2021 projects include Malibu Rescue, an action feature for Netflix and the series that follows.

Films
 Inferno (1998)
 The Apartment Complex (1999)
 The Burbs (2002)
 Revenge (2007)
 Gym Teacher: The Movie (2008)
 Merry Christmas, Drake & Josh (2008)
 Spectacular! (2009)
 The Boy Who Cried Werewolf (2010)
 Best Player (2011)
 A Fairly Odd Movie: Grow Up, Timmy Turner! (2011)
 Big Time Movie (2012)
 Rags (2012)
 A Fairly Odd Christmas (2012)
 Swindle (2013)
 Jinxed (2013)
 A Fairly Odd Summer (2014)
 Santa Hunters (2014)
 Splitting Adam (2015)
 One Crazy Cruise (2015)
 Liar, Liar, Vampire (2015)
 Rufus (2016)
 Legends of the Hidden Temple (2016)
 Rufus 2 (2017)
 Escape from Mr. Lemoncello's Library (2017)
 Inside Voice (2018)
 Malibu Rescue (Movie) (2019)
 Malibu Rescue (Series) (2019)(2021)

References

Deadline - Pacific Bay Entertainment
Hollywood Reporter - Inside Voice
Kidscreen - Inside Voice
Worldscreen - Inside Voice
TigerBeat - Inside Voice
YSBnow - Inside Voice
The Slanted - Inside Voice
VR Focus - Inside Voice
VR and Fun - Inside Voice
Kidscreen - Escape From Mr. Lemoncello's Library

External links
 

Film production companies of the United States
Place of birth missing (living people)
Television production companies of the United States
Living people
1975 births